San Donnino  or San Donnino Martire is a Romanesque style Catholic church in Piacenza, Region of Emilia Romagna, Italy. Little is known of San Donnino (St Domninus), to whom the church is dedicated, as are other churches elsewhere, including Pisa. A St Domninus appears in early Church sources and some identify him with St Domninus of Fidenza, to whom Fidenza Cathedral is also dedicated. For some the Piacenza Domninus was a  deacon of Piacenza in the early Christian period.

History
A church was built on the site by the 12th century, but rebuilt in 1236 by Cardinal  Jacopo da Pecoraria, Bishop of Palestrina (1231-1244), who in his youth had been a cleric attached to the church. The original  structure dating from this time follows a decidedly Romanesque basilica plan with three naves closed by semi-circular apses. The interior and the façade were remodeled  throughout the centuries. After a sudden collapse of the nave in 1951, the latest restoration removed many of the additions accumulated over the centuries. The choir and the sanctuary had been frescoed with quadratura by Francesco and Giovanni Battista Natali, with figures by Bartolomeo Rusca. The church houses the adoration of the Blessed Sacrament and holds a bronze crucifix by Giorgio Groppi  donated by the baker's guild in town. It also held a canvas of St Anne, St Joseph, and other Saints by Bartolomeo Baderna.

An congregation of religious women is affiliated with the parish church.

References

Churches completed in 1236
13th-century Roman Catholic church buildings in Italy
Roman Catholic churches in Piacenza
Romanesque architecture in Piacenza